The Berryville Post Office is a historic post office building at 101 East Madison Avenue in Berryville, Arkansas.  It is a single-story brick Colonial Revival structure, topped by a hip roof and cupola with finial.  It was designed by Louis A. Simon and built in 1938–39.  Although primarily intended to serve the needs of the United States Postal Service, the basement housed offices of various county agents.  The building is primarily notable for the plaster sculpture above the postmaster's office, which was created in 1940 by Daniel Gillette Olney as part of the Treasury Departments Section of Fine Arts, a jobs program for artists.

The building was listed on the National Register of Historic Places in 1998.

See also 

National Register of Historic Places listings in Carroll County, Arkansas
List of United States post offices

References 

Post office buildings on the National Register of Historic Places in Arkansas
Colonial Revival architecture in Arkansas
Buildings and structures completed in 1938
Buildings and structures in Berryville, Arkansas
National Register of Historic Places in Carroll County, Arkansas
Historic district contributing properties in Arkansas